Larry Jim McKinney (July 4, 1944 – September 21, 2017) was a United States district judge of the United States District Court for the Southern District of Indiana.

Education and career

Born in South Bend, Indiana on July 4, 1944, McKinney received a Bachelor of Arts degree from MacMurray College in 1966 and a Juris Doctor from Indiana University Maurer School of Law in 1969. He was a deputy state attorney general of Indiana from 1970 to 1971. He was in private practice in Edinburgh, Indiana from 1971 to 1975. He was in private practice in Greenwood, Indiana from 1975 to 1979. He was a Circuit Judge of Johnson County, Indiana from 1979 to 1987.

Federal judicial service

McKinney was nominated by President Ronald Reagan on May 5, 1987, to a seat on the United States District Court for the Southern District of Indiana vacated by Judge William Elwood Steckler. He was confirmed by the United States Senate on July 17, 1987, and received his commission on July 20, 1987. He served as Chief Judge from 2001 to 2007. He assumed senior status on July 4, 2009, and served in that status until his death on September 21, 2017.

References

Sources
 

1944 births
2017 deaths
Indiana state court judges
Judges of the United States District Court for the Southern District of Indiana
United States district court judges appointed by Ronald Reagan
20th-century American judges
People from South Bend, Indiana
People from Greenwood, Indiana
MacMurray College alumni
Indiana University Maurer School of Law alumni
21st-century American judges